TypeShift is a word puzzle video game developed by Zach Gage.

Gameplay

TypeShift is a word puzzle video game in which the player must spell out words by sliding letters in columns (by sliding the columns up and down). When a player makes a word, the letters in the word turn green. The player's goal is to have all the letters on the stage be turned green. There are also "key" words, which if found by the player, allow them to quickly solve a puzzle.

The game also includes "clue" stages in addition to the standard stages. In a clue stage, the player is presented with clues (like a crossword puzzle) as well as the columns of letters. The player solves a clue by tapping on the clue and if they are correct, the clue will disappear.

Development and release
TypeShift was developed by Zach Gage. The game released for iOS devices on March 18, 2017. A web browser version was also released and hosted by Merriam-Webster but no longer appears to be available as of October 2021. An Android port, produced by Noodlecake Studios, was released on December 20, 2017.

Reception

TypeShift received "generally favorable" reviews from professional critics according to review aggregator website Metacritic, receiving a score of 86 out of 100. Gamezebo rated the game 4 out of 5 stars, praising the game's "substantial challenge without feeling impossible", that the game lets the player "learn new words and expand your vocabulary" and that it is "easy to make the ads disappear" while criticizing the limited number of puzzles available and that "the ads are a poor match for a beautiful game". TouchArcade rated the game 4 out of 5 stars calling it an "attractive game with an enjoyable primary mechanic" but criticizing the game giving away the "key words" after solving a puzzle.

See also 
 Really Bad Chess
 SpellTower

References

External links
 
 TypeShift at Merriam-Webster

2017 video games
Browser games
IOS games
Noodlecake Games games
Single-player video games
Video games designed by Zach Gage
Video games developed in the United States
Word puzzle video games